Skansen Kronan ("the Crown Sconce") is a redoubt on the hill Risåsberget,  in the Haga district of Gothenburg, Sweden.

The fortress and its twin, Skansen Lejonet, were built to protect the city of Gothenburg against possible Danish attack, and thus had a similar purpose to the sea fort of New Älvsborg, which was built around the same time.

History
The city of Gothenburg was founded in 1621. The new settlement was equipped with an impressive network of fortifications, but military engineers were concerned by the fact that the city was overlooked by two hills, the Gullberg and the Risåsberg, and so it was decided to construct forts on both hilltops in order to prevent potential attackers from siting artillery there. The two forts were designed by Erik Dahlbergh, with the one on the Risåsberg being named Skansen Kronan and the one on the Gullberg being named Skansen Lejonet.

Work began on Skansen Kronan in 1687, and the fort was officially commissioned in 1698 and equipped with 23 guns, though the roof was not actually completed until 1700. It has 4-5 metre thick walls made of granite, gneiss and diabase. Skansen Kronan was never attacked, and the cannons were never fired in anger.

Around the year 1900 it was decided to turn the fortress into a military museum, which opened on 23 November 1904. The museum closed in September 2004, and its collections were transferred to the Museum of Gothenburg.

Skansen Kronan was recognised as a listed building in 1935.

At the time of its construction, Skansen Kronan was located outside the city walls, but the hill was later swallowed up by urban sprawl, becoming part of Haga in west-central Gothenburg. Today Skansen Kronan is privately-owned and used as a venue for conferences and private parties.

See also
Skansen Lejonet
New Älvsborg
Fortifications of Gothenburg

References

Other sources
 
Mattsson, Britt-Marie (1992) Parkernas Göteborg (Göteborg: AB Långedrag, Tryckeri AB Framåt)   
Rhedin,  Per (1996) Med hammare, sax och tång: En liten historik om plåtslageriet i Göteborg,   (utgiven av Göteborgs Bleck- & Plåtslagaremästareförening)   
Schånberg, Sven; Stig Allan Agroth (1989) Vid Skansbergets fot : Hagastudier i bild och ord (Göteborg)

External links
Skansen Kronan website
Göteborgs skansar
https://skansenkronan.se Official Website

17th-century fortifications
Buildings and structures completed in 1698
Castles in Västra Götaland County
Forts in Sweden
History of Gothenburg
Museums in Gothenburg
Military and war museums in Sweden
17th-century establishments in Sweden
1698 establishments in Sweden
Listed buildings in Gothenburg